Dinara Batyrkhanovna Dikambayeva ( (Dinara Batyrhanqyzy Dikambaeva), ; born 11 May 1982) is a Kazakhstani ice hockey player. She competed in the women's tournament at the 2002 Winter Olympics.

References

External links
 

1982 births
Living people
Kazakhstani women's ice hockey forwards
Olympic ice hockey players of Kazakhstan
Ice hockey players at the 2002 Winter Olympics
Asian Games gold medalists for Kazakhstan
Asian Games bronze medalists for Kazakhstan
Medalists at the 1999 Asian Winter Games
Medalists at the 2003 Asian Winter Games
Asian Games medalists in ice hockey
Ice hockey players at the 1999 Asian Winter Games
Ice hockey players at the 2003 Asian Winter Games
Sportspeople from Almaty